Terrace station is on the Canadian National Railway mainline in Terrace, British Columbia, Canada. The station is served by Via Rail's Jasper–Prince Rupert train.

References 

Terrace, British Columbia
Via Rail stations in British Columbia